In the Dungeons & Dragons fantasy role-playing game, illithids (commonly known as mind flayers) are monstrous humanoid aberrations with psionic powers.  In a typical Dungeons & Dragons campaign setting, they live in the moist caverns and cities of the enormous Underdark.  Illithids believe themselves to be the dominant species of the multiverse and use other intelligent creatures as thralls, slaves, and chattel. Illithids are well known for making thralls out of other intelligent creatures, as well as feasting on their brains.

Publication history
Mind flayers were created by Gary Gygax, who has said that one of his inspirations for them was the cover painting of the Titus Crow book The Burrowers Beneath by Brian Lumley. Tim Kirk's cover art on the book, then in its first printing, depicted only the tentacles of the titular burrowers, the Chthonians.

Dungeons & Dragons (1974–1976)
Mind flayers first appeared in the official newsletter of TSR, The Strategic Review #1, Spring 1975, in the section named "Creature Features". Here, the mind flayer is described as "a super-intelligent, man-shaped creature with four tentacles by its mouth which it uses to strike its prey." When it hits prey with a tentacle, the tentacle penetrates to the brain and draws it forth, allowing the monster to devour it. A mind flayer's major weapon is given as the Mind Blast, a 5-foot radius wave of "Psi force" which affects each opponent differently based on how intelligent it is; possible effects include permanent insanity, rage, confusion, coma, and death. They were also included in the Eldritch Wizardry supplement, for the original (white box) Dungeons & Dragons game (1976), wherein they are described as super-intelligent, man-shaped creatures of great (and lawful) evil, with tentacles that penetrate to the brain and draw it forth for food.

Advanced Dungeons & Dragons 1st edition (1977–1988)
The mind flayer appears in the first edition Monster Manual (1977). Roger E. Moore authored "The Ecology of the Mind Flayer," which featured in Dragon #78 (October 1983).

The article "The Sunset World" by Stephen Inniss in Dragon #150 (October 1989) presented a world that had been completely ravaged by mind flayers. The "Dragon's Bestiary" column, in the same issue and by the same author, described the illithidae, the strange inhabitants of this world.

Advanced Dungeons & Dragons 2nd edition (1989–1999)
The mind flayer appears first in the Monstrous Compendium Volume One (1989), and is reprinted in the Monstrous Manual (1993).

The ulitharid, or "noble illithid" was introduced in the Dungeon adventure Thunder Under Needlespire by James Jacobs in Dungeon #24 (July/August 1990), and later included in the Monstrous Compendium Annual One (1994).

The Complete Psionics Handbook (1991) presented ways on using mind flayers with psionic powers.

The alhoon, also known as the illithilich or mind flayer lich, was introduced in the Menzoberranzan boxed set, in the booklet "Book One: The City" (1992).

The book The Illithiad (April 1998), and the Monstrous Arcana module series that accompanies it, greatly develops the mind flayer further. The Illithiad introduced the illithid elder brain and the illithid-roper crossbreed, the urophion. The module Dawn of the Overmind featured an origin story for the illithids.

Dungeons & Dragons 3.0 edition (2000–2002)
The mind flayer appears in the Monster Manual for this edition (2000). Savage Species (2003) added the mind flayer "racial class", allowing Mind Flayers to be played from level 1 onward until they reached parity with normal Mind Flayers, and added the "Illithid Savant" prestige class.

Dungeons & Dragons 3.5 edition (2003–2007)
The mind flayer appears in the revised Monster Manual for this edition (2003), in both playable and non-playable forms. One of the differences between the playable Mind Flayer in the Monster Manual and the Mind Flayer racial class in Savage Species is that the racial class has only itself as a favored class, while the normal Mind Flayer has wizard as a favored class. The mind flayer received its own chapter in the book Lords of Madness: The Book of Aberrations (2005).

The Expanded Psionics Handbook (2004) re-introduced the psionic mind flayer, detailing the differences between psionic and normal mind flayers, although creating a Psionic Mind Flayer still requires the information from the Monster Manual. Monster Manual V (2007) introduced the concept of "thoon", a driving force (be it some alien god, outside philosophy, or other driving incentive) which has changed several mindflayers' world outlooks.

Dungeons & Dragons 4th edition (2008–2014)
The mind flayer appears in the Monster Manual for this edition (2008).

Dungeons & Dragons 5th edition (2014–present)
The mind flayer appears in the Monster Manual for this edition (2014).

Additional information about the mind flayers is found in Volo's Guide to Monsters (2016). The information includes details about their origins, their reproduction, their dispositions and behaviors, and their elder brain. The book also details this edition's Alhoon,  Ulitharid, Mindwitness and Neothelid.

Fictional physical characteristics 
Illithids have a humanoid body with an octopus-like head. They have four tentacles around a lamprey-like mouth, and require the brains of sentient creatures as part of their diet. An illithid who snares a living creature in all four of its tentacles can extract and devour its living brain.  Their eyes are pale white, and they can see perfectly well in both darkness and light.  Their sense of hearing is slightly poorer than a human's; they have difficulty distinguishing between several sounds mixed together, yet they are good at discerning from what direction sounds came from.  Their skin is purplish blue to gray-green and covered in mucus, and is very sensitive to sunlight.  They loathe sunlight, though it does not actually harm them.

One of their most feared powers is the dreaded Mind Blast, where the illithid emits a cone-shaped psionic shock wave with its mind in order to incapacitate any creature for a short amount of time. Illithids also have other psionic powers, generally telepathic in nature, although their exact effects have varied over editions. Other powers include a defensive psionic shield and powers of psionic domination for controlling the minds of others.

Biology
Illithids are hermaphroditic creatures who each spawn a mass of larvae two or three times in their life. The larvae resemble miniature illithid heads or four-tentacled tadpoles. Larvae are left to develop in the pool of the Elder Brain. The ones that survive after 10 years are inserted into the brain of a sapient creature. Hosts are determined in a very specific manner. Hosts generally are humanoid creatures that are between 5 feet 4 inches and 6 feet 2 inches. The most desirable of races for hosts are humans, drow, elves, githzerai, githyanki, grimlocks, gnolls, goblinoids, and orcs. Upon being implanted (through any cranial orifice), the larva then grows and consumes the host's brain, absorbing the host's physical form entirely and becoming sapient itself, a physically mature (but mentally young) illithid. This process is called ceremorphosis. Illithids often experiment with non-humanoid hosts, but ceremorphosis involving other creatures usually fails, killing both host and larva. The transformation between the host (almost always a human or similar humanoid, such as an elf or dwarf) takes about a week, unless detected and removed within about thirty minutes of injection into the incapacitated host.

When an illithid undergoes ceremorphosis, it can occasionally take on some elements of the absorbed host creature's former mind, such as mannerisms.  This typically manifests as a minor personality feature, such as a nervous habit or reaction (e.g., nail-biting or tapping one's foot), although the process that determines the type and number of traits so inherited appears to be stochastic. Some adult illithids have even been known to hum a tune that its host knew in life. Usually, when a mind flayer inherits a trait like this, it keeps it a closely guarded secret, because, were its peers to learn of it, the illithid in question would most likely be killed. This is due to an illithid legend of a being called the "Adversary". The legend holds that, eventually, an illithid larva that undergoes ceremorphosis will take on the host's personality and memory in its entirety. This Adversary would, mind and soul, still be the host, but with all the inherent abilities of an illithid.

Occasionally, ceremorphosis can partially fail. Sometimes the larva does not contain enough chemicals to complete the process, sometimes there is psionic interference. Whatever the reason, it has happened that ceremorphosis has ended after the internal restructuring, resulting in a human body with an illithid's brain, personality and digestive tract. These unfortunates must still consume brains, typically by cutting open heads (as they lack the requisite tentacles). These beings are often used as spies, where they easily blend in with their respective host types.

Illithid society also maintains a long-standing taboo related to deviations to or failures of the ceremorphosis process and hunt and destroy such exceptions. Occasionally mind flayer communities are attacked (often by vengeful githyanki and githzerai) and their inhabitants must flee. This leaves the larvae unattended. Bereft of exterior nourishment, they begin to consume one another. The survivor will eventually leave the pool in search of food (brains). This unmorphed larvae is known as neothelids. If the neothelid consumes an intelligent creature it will awaken to sapience and psionic abilities and grow to immense size, while retaining its memories of savage survival. In Complete Psionic, it was revealed that illithids have a step between larva and neothelid called a Larval Flayer, which looks like an overgrown tadpole. The existence of these beasts is a guarded secret among illithids, and it is considered impolite to speak of them.

Variants

Alhoon
Alhoons (also called illithiliches) are illithids that choose to focus on developing arcane abilities in addition to their psionic ones, and have grown powerful enough in magic to become undead liches.  Alhoons are generally pariahs in illithid society because they go against most illithids' eventual goal: to merge with the Elder Brain, both physically and psionically.  Alhoons, on the other hand, are more concerned with their own personal survival. When discovered near illithid communities, Alhoons are mercilessly hunted down.

The alhoon first appeared in second edition AD&D for the Forgotten Realms setting in the Menzoberranzan boxed set, in the booklet "Book One: The City" (1992), and reprinted in Monstrous Compendium Annual Volume Three (1996). The creature was further detailed in the supplement The Illithiad (1998). The alhoon also appeared in third edition in Monsters of Faerûn (2001) and Lords of Madness (2005).

Ulitharid
Ulitharids are created from tadpoles much like standard illithids; fewer than 0.1% become ulitharids, and it is impossible to determine whether a tadpole will become an ulitharid until ceremorphosis is complete.

Superior in nearly all ways to a regular mind flayer, ulitharids possess two extra tentacles, which are twice as long as the others, and an extreme arrogance, even by the standards of their own kind. Only the Elder Brain holds more sway within an illithid community.

Vampiric illithids
The origins of these unique undead mind flayers are unclear. All that is known of these creatures is that they cannot create spawn, need both fresh blood and fresh brains to survive, are more feral than typical illithids, and are barely intelligent. One possible origin is given in the Ravenloft adventure Thoughts of Darkness, where "vampiric mind flayers are either the result of a Mind Flayer tadpole infecting a vampiric host or a host that becomes a vampire before the tadpole fully converts them". These creatures are hated and feared by typical illithids. Christian Hoffer, for ComicBook.com, wrote, "Not only do the vampiric mind flayers possess the psionic powers of a mind flayer, they also have the undead strength and bloodlust of a vampire, making them twice as deadly". Hoffer also highlighted that they "were created when Lyssa von Zarovich (a descendant of Strahd) attempted to create a creature powerful enough to overthrow her great uncle". Jacob Creswell, for CBR, highlighted that "Vampiric Mind Flayers are a classic Dungeon & Dragons monster that combines two terrifying concepts. [...] Originally known as vampiric illithids, vampiric mind flayers were a force to be reckoned with in Advanced Dungeons & Dragons. Their superior strength stat meant that they'd be able to overpower most adventurers". Creswell included them on list of the seven best monsters introduced in the 5th Edition campaign guide Van Richten's Guide to Ravenloft.

Related creatures
Brain Golem:  An eight-foot-tall humanoid-shaped construct made entirely of brain tissue, these creations exist only to serve an elder brain and its illithid community.

Brainstealer Dragon:  A mix of illithid and dragon, these powerful wyrms occasionally rule over illithid communities that lack an elder brain.

Illithidae:  Illithidae are to mind flayers as less intelligent animals are to humans.  Known types include the cessirid, embrac, kigrid, and saltor. Dragon magazine once published a template for use in creating an illithidae creature, for use with the 1st Edition of the Advanced Dungeons & Dragons game.  They were updated in 3.5 in the Lords of Madness supplement.

Illithocyte: Illithid tadpoles that survived the fall of a mind flayer empire, they evolved into a new life form and now crawl about in groups seeking psychic radiation on which to feed.

Kezreth: A living troop transport and battle platform created from the severed head of a shamed illithid. They serve in this capacity in the hope of redeeming themselves and being allowed to return to the elder brain.

Mind Worm:  Created by illithids to serve as assassins and bounty hunters, these powerful psionic creatures resemble smaller purple worms.  They can attack from far distances with their probe worms.

Mindwitness:  Inserting an illithid tadpole into a beholder results in these abominations, which are used as guards and sentries.

Mozgriken: An illithid tadpole inserted into a svirfneblin gnome while subjected to a dangerous psionic ritual creates a mozgriken. These three-tentacled ceremorphs are despised by all, but their aptitude for stealth and psionic powers of stealth and shape control make them useful spies for the illithids.

Neothelid: If an illithid tadpole survives but fails to undergo ceremorphosis, it will eventually grow into an incredibly powerful worm-like creature with illithid tentacles at the forefront of its body and immense mental powers.

Nerve Swimmers:  Derived from immature illithid tadpoles, these entities are living instruments of torture and interrogation.

Nyraala Golem: A flailing, slimy, tentacled construct capable of launching surprise attacks. They often serve as guards, and are prized because their creation does not involve petitioning the elder brain to surrender part of its mass.

Octopin:  A six-tentacled, purple-skinned monstrosity with a single eye created by mind flayers.

Oortlings: These docile humanoids with enlarged brains were bred by illithids as food.

Seugathi: Seugathi are spawned by the hundreds by a single neothelid that has performed rituals to impregnate itself.

Tzakandi: Illithid tadpoles inserted into lizardfolk create tzakandi, which the mind flayers use as slave labourers and personal guards.

Uchuulon: A chuul implanted with an illithid tadpole becomes an uchuulon. Also known as slime chuuls, illithids use them as hunters and guardians.

Urophion:  Inserting an illithid tadpole into a roper results in these miserable creatures, which are used as guards and sentries.

Ustilagor:  Mind flayers farm these larval intellect devourers for food and sentries.

Vampire Squid: Servitor creatures created by illithids to extend their reach below the surface of Underdark waters.  They have a maw of sharp teeth which can be turned inside out and function as defensive spikes.

Voidmind Creatures: A voidmind creature is an ordinary creature (such as a normal human or human-like creature or animal) whose mind has been nearly devoured by a mind flayer, but enough has been left intact for basic motor function. Further psionic rituals give these near dead creatures a semblance of life. The resulting creatures act as minions and spies for the Illithids.

(From Dragon #150 : Monsters Associated With Illithids:
Amorphs,
Gelatinous cube,
Gray ooze,
Lurker above,
Mimic,
Ochre jelly,
Pudding, deadly;
Roper,
Scum creeper,
Slithering tracker,
Trapper,
Crystal ooze,
Mustard jelly,
Fungi,
Ascomoid,
Basidirond,
Fungus, violet,
Gas spore,
Mold, brown;
Mold, yellow;
Obliviax,
Phycomid,
Shrieker,
Ustilagor,
Zygom,
Illithidae,
Carrion crawler,
Cessirid,
Embrac,
Illithid,
Kigrid
Saltor )

Symbionts
Illithids often create symbionts, a kind of living item eventually adapted for the Eberron campaign setting. Illithids use these symbionts for themselves and their slaves. These symbionts help their general offensive and defensive capabilities.  Known illithid symbionts include the mnemonicus, wriggler, and carapace symbionts.

Fictional history 
The origins of the illithids has been described in several conflicting stories offered in various D&D products, in past editions and in the current version of the game, which can be taken as successive retcons.

The 2nd Edition book The Illithiad suggests they may be from the Far Realm, an incomprehensible plane completely alien to the known multiverse. There is no mention of time travel in this theory. Instead, they emerged somewhere countless thousands of years ago, beyond the histories of many mortal races, and spread from one world to another, and another, and so on. It is explicitly stated in this book that the illithids appear in some of the most ancient histories of the most ancient races, even those that have no mention of other races.

The 3.5 Edition D&D supplement Lords of Madness provides that the Illithid were a star-faring people who existed at the end of time. Facing annihilation, the Illithid traveled to the past, arriving roughly 2000 years before the present in any given D&D campaign.

The 4th Edition preview Wizards Presents Worlds and Monsters supports the claim that mind flayers originate from the Far Realm.

In these two differing versions of the story, much of the variance hinges upon a fictional text called The Sargonne Prophecies. The Illithiad described the Prophecies as misnamed, and that much of it sounds more like ancient myth than prophecy. Lords of Madness takes the name more literally, and states that The Sargonne Prophecies are in fact prophecy—or, perhaps more accurately, a history of the future.

Yet another version came from The Astromundi Cluster, a Spelljammer boxed set produced before The Illithiad. This version holds that the illithids are descended from the outcasts of an ancient human society that ruled the now-shattered world called Astromundi. The outcast humans eventually mutated, deep underground, into the mind flayers. (This boxed set also introduced the entity known as Lugribossk, who was depicted as a god of the Astromundi flayers then, but was later retconned into a proxy of the god Ilsensine.) In the retconned history of the illithids found in either The Illithiad or Lords of Madness, the emergence of illithids in Astromundi becomes a freak occurrence due to the intervention of Ilsensine through its proxy, since the illithids of Astromundi have their own histories as emerging solely upon that world.

However and whenever it occurred, when the illithids arrived in the Material Plane of the far past, they immediately began to build an empire by enslaving many sentient creatures. They were very successful, and soon their worlds-spanning empire became the largest one the multiverse had ever seen. They had the power—in terms of psychic potency and the manpower of countless slaves—to fashion artificial worlds. One such world was this empire's capital, called Penumbra, a diskworld built around a star, which was a thousand years in the making. Such was their might that the Blood War paused as the demons and devils considered a truce to deal with the illithid empire.

Eventually, the primary slave race of the illithids developed resistance to the mental powers of their masters, and revolted.  Led by the warrior Gith, the rebellion spread to all the illithids' worlds, and the empire collapsed.  The illithid race itself seemed doomed.

Gith was betrayed by one of her own generals, Zerthimon, who believed she had grown tyrannical and over-aggressive.  Civil war erupted, and the race factionalised into the githyanki and the githzerai (and in the Spelljammer campaign setting the Pirates of Gith). This disruption allowed the illithids to retreat to underground strongholds where they still dwell.

Dungeon #100 claims the original home of the gith forerunners was a world known as Pharagos. Currently it is described as, "an unremarkable Material-Plane world, a far cry from the hotbed of magical activity and divine intervention that is the Forgotten Realms campaign or the World of Greyhawk." Beneath the Wasting Desert on that world, however, is the petrified corpse of the long-dead patron deity of the ancestors of the gith races. As is recounted in most 1st and 2nd edition sources, the ancestors of the gith forerunners were a human civilization before being modified by countless generations of illithid breeding and profane science.

The background material of the Chainmail game places the gith forerunners in a subterranean empire called Zarum in Western Oerik, where they dominated many other races from their capital city of Anithor. These gith seem to have been divided into a rigid caste system, their lives ruled by ancient ritual. The ruins of Zarum overflow with sacred spaces and temples, though the names of the ancient gith gods are unknown today. The period of Zarum's height is not entirely clear, but grey elf sages speculate it was approximately 2,000 years before the Demon Wars that ravaged Western Oerik, or 3,000 years before the present.

At some point, the illithids invaded Zarum from a neighboring plane of existence. Though the gith fought fiercely, they were no match for the psionic might of the mind flayers, and soon they were enslaved. The River of Angry Souls is a remnant of one of the terrible battles between the illithids and the soon-to-be enslaved gith. Many were brought to the Outer Planes and elsewhere to serve as illithid slaves. Other cities in Zarum were transformed into work pits where illithid overseers forced their slaves to toil for countless generations.

After Gith's rebellion, she led her people to the Astral Plane. While a few subject races and surviving illithids remained on Oerth, the gith forerunners have departed the world, seemingly for good. If they retain any interest in the ruins of Zarum, it is well concealed. A portion of the ruins of Anithor were eventually colonized by the drow of House Kilsek, who named their new settlement Kalan-G'eld.

Fictional society 
An illithid city is ruled by a creature called an Elder Brain which lives in a pool of cerebral fluid in the city's center. When an illithid dies its brain is extracted and taken to the pool. Illithids believe that when they die their personality is incorporated into the Elder Brain, but this is not the case. When the brain of an illithid is added to the Elder Brain, the memories, thoughts and experiences are consumed and added to the sum of the whole, but all else is lost. This fact is a closely guarded secret of the Elder Brains, since all illithid aspire to a form of immortality through this merging process. An extremely ancient Elder Brain is called a God-Brain because its psionic powers are almost limitless.

Since the Elder Brain contains the essence of every illithid that died in its community, it functions in part as a vast library of knowledge that a mind flayer can call upon with a simple telepathic call.  The Elder Brain in turn can communicate telepathically with anyone in its community, issuing orders and ensuring everyone conforms.

Illithids generally frown upon magic, preferring their natural psionic ability.  Psionic potential is an integral part of the illithid identity, and the Elder Brain cannot absorb the magical powers of an illithid mage when it dies.  They tolerate a limited study of wizardry, if only to better understand the powers employed by their enemies.  However, an illithid who goes too far and neglects his psionic development in favor of wizardry risks becoming an outcast.  Denied the possibility of ever merging with the Elder Brain, such outcasts often seek their own immortality through undeath, becoming alhoons.

Illithids typically communicate through psychic means.  They project thoughts and feelings to each other in a way non-illithids can scarcely comprehend. When they do feel the need to write, they do so in "qualith." Instead of typical alphabet-based writing, illithids write in qualith by making marks consisting of four broken lines.  They use each tentacle to feel the breaks in the lines, making it basically similar to braille.  However, qualith is extremely complex, as each line modifies the preceding lines through explaining abstract concepts associated with the above words in ways no human can understand; only by understanding all four lines simultaneously can the meaning be understood properly.

Religion
Traditionally illithids revere a perverse deity named Ilsensine. In 2nd edition, they have a second deity named Maanzecorian, who is later killed by Tenebrous (Orcus) in the Planescape adventure module Dead Gods. Although Ilsensine is the illithid patron deity, few mind flayers actively worship it, thinking themselves the most powerful creatures in the universe.

Relations with other races
Illithids seek to rebuild their former empire wherein all other species were their slaves, so they view any sentient creature as worthy only of being their slaves or their food.  They are pragmatic, however, and will trade with other races, such as dark elves and gray dwarves, who are too strong to be conquered. They also trade with the Neogi in order to obtain slaves.

Their archenemies are the githyanki and the githzerai, descendants of the rebellious slaves who destroyed their empire millennia ago.  Hunting and slaying illithids whenever they can is an integral part of their cultures.

Illithids fear the undead because these creatures, even the sentient ones, are immune to telepathic detection and manipulation, and have no brains to consume.  Confronting such mindless creatures can even be traumatizing to some of them.

According to the Lords of Madness history, Illithids are one of the few races respected by the aboleths. This is because the aboleths remember the origin of almost every other race, through their hereditary memory. However, illithids, as far the aboleths can remember, just appeared without preamble, which scares them.

Activities
Currently, the illithids are in a period of intense study and experimentation, gathering knowledge of all sorts that will enable them to eventually reconquer the universe and hold it for good.  They frequently meddle in the politics of other races through subtle psychic manipulation of key figures, not to cause chaos but so as to better understand the dynamics of civilization.  They regularly probe the minds of surface dwellers so as to gather intelligence and learn about new advances in magic and technology.  They also do a good deal of research themselves, mainly focused on developing new psychic powers.

Illithids regularly conduct raids on all sentient settlements to acquire new thralls, because their existing stock of sentient thralls do not breed fast enough to satisfy their food and labor needs.  Typically, a group of mind flayers will teleport to the settlement and swiftly incapacitate them with their psychic powers.  The captives will then be marched all the way to the illithids' underground settlement by specially trained and conditioned thralls.  Great care is taken to cover their tracks.

In various campaign settings

In Dragonlance 
The yaggol are a variant presented in the Dragonlance campaign setting.

The Yaggol are a race from the Emerald Sea of Neron, a dark, steamy jungle in southern Taladas. The history of their civilization stretches back to the end of the first age of Krynn. Their empire was thriving at the same time the High Ogres of Ansalon founded their own empire. Enslaving the Cha'asii elves, the yaggol ruled over the continent with a nightmarish will but this all came to end when the cha'asii learned how to defeat the mind powers of the yaggol. A great war was fought, and the empire crumbled as both sides nearly wiped each other out. All that remained of this once aberrant race were seven obsidian temples in The Valley of Akh-Tazi.

After the shattering of the empire, an uneasy truce was struck, only broken by skirmishes and murder. The cha'asii went their separate ways; establishing villages like Ke-Cha-Yat where they could live in peace from the yaggol. This would all change with the coming of Gloomwing, a former orthlox Black Dragon that joined with the Brethren, the cult followers of Maladar an-Desh, Lord of Wizards.

In Eberron
In Eberron, the illithid come from Xoriat, the plane of Madness.  They were created by the Daelkyr in their invasion plans.  It is not known if they have elder brains, but their continued existence implies that they can breed on their own.  The mind flayers of Eberron are resistant to damage from all weapons except those made out of byeshk, a new exotic material in the Eberron setting.

In Greyhawk
Illithids typically dwell in dim, underground settlements, usually in the Underdark. Perhaps the best-known illithid settlement on Oerth is the city of Dra-Mur-Shou, located within several miles of the Vault of the Drow. A number of illithids also make their home in the drow city of Erelhei-Cinlu, due to the presence of a well-known mind flayer research center.

Greyspace
Illithids also have a strong presence in Greyspace and spheres beyond. The primary spelljamming ship used by illithids is the nautiloid, a 35-ton craft resembling a nautilus. Nautiloids are 125' to 180' long, including the tentacle-like piercing ram. The ship's coiled shell provides the comfort of enclosed space and protects the illithids from the rays of solar bodies. Less common illithid vessels such as the 25-ton squid ship, the 70-ton octopus, and the 100-ton cuttle command also resemble the cephalopods after which they are named.

In Greyspace, the largest illithid settlements are the city of Sharpbeak on Celene and the settlement of Skullbringer in the Grinder. Worlds ruled by illithids in other spheres include Falx, Ssirik Akuar, Penumbra, and Glyth.

In Ravenloft
Illithids are the rulers of a domain in the Ravenloft campaign setting called Bluetspur, where their God-Brain is the darklord. In the 5th Edition campaign guide Van Richten's Guide to Ravenloft, it is revealed that an elder-brain became diseased by discovering a "malignant truth" and it began to prey "upon its peers [...]. Horrified by an affliction that infected only them, the other elder brains united and psionically expelled the diseased brain from existence. Or so they thought. From a place without time or reality, the Dark Powers plucked the dying elder brain and planted it upon a tormented world". Polygon highlighted that Bluetspur is "a world of cosmic horror populated by malevolent mind flayers that will make your heroes question their own memories".

In Spelljammer
According to Ken Rolston, the beholder and the mind flayer "win starring roles as intergalactic menaces" in Spelljammer, describing the mind flayers as "evil, brain-sucking horrors who have polished up their social skills sufficiently to present a dubiously neutral facade to trading partners as they secretly scheme toward the day when all intelligent races will be their vassals and brain-food".

Mind Flayers are one of the primary factions in the Spelljammer campaign setting.  While less prominent than the neogi, illithids are in complete control of Glyth, a Realmspace planet, and have been for millennia. They are also one of the two most powerful factions in The Astromundi Cluster setting.

Illithids' primary ship type is the nautiloid, a 35-ton craft resembling a nautilus.  Nautiloids are 125', or 180' long including the tentacle-like piercing ram.  The ships' coiled shell provides the comfort of enclosed space and protects the illithids from solar radiation.

Less common illithid vessels such as the 25-ton squidship, the 70-ton octopus, and the 100-ton cuttle command also resemble the cephalopods after which they are named.

In the Spelljammer setting, the illithids are the creators of the oortlings, a humanoid race of high intelligence and enlarged size.  Bred as food, the oortlings are completely docile and have little motivation and almost no instinct for self-preservation.

Critical reception
The mind flayer was ranked fourth among the ten best mid-level monsters by the authors of Dungeons & Dragons For Dummies. They referred to this unique creation of the D&D game as the "quintessential evil genius" and the "perfect evil overlord".

The Stranger writer Cienna Madrid described the Mind Flayer as one of D&D's "ghastly fiends".

Rob Bricken from io9 named the mind flayer as the 9th most memorable D&D monster.

SyFy Wire in 2018 called it one of "The 9 Scariest, Most Unforgettable Monsters From Dungeons & Dragons", saying that "Mind flayers are another classic monster like the beholder."

Screen Rant compiled a list of the game's "10 Most Powerful (And 10 Weakest) Monsters, Ranked" in 2018, calling the elder brain one of the strongest, saying that the 5th "edition of Dungeons & Dragons has toned down the elder brain a lot", it "still represents a grave threat to most adventuring parties, thanks to its range of powerful enchantment spells and psionic attacks, but it isn't quite the epic level threat that it once was." Reviewer Scott Baird also found that the illithids in general "are considered to be one of the most disliked creatures in all of Dungeons & Dragons."

Philip J. Clements considered mind flayers of the "game's signature monsters".

Games journalist David M. Ewalt called them "one of D&D's most popular monsters".

Reviewer Julien Blondel for Backstab described them as vile brain-eating creatures full of psionic energy. He found them delightful creatures for a sadistic Dungeon Master to use, and a useful bridge between classic game worlds and the planes, as illithids abound in both.

In other media

Mind flayers appear in other role-playing games, including Angband, Bloodborne, Demon's Souls, Final Fantasy, NetHack, Lost Kingdoms, Kingdom of Loathing and Lost Souls,  and the one-player gamebook RPG series Fighting Fantasy includes a creature similar to the illithid, the Brain Slayer.

 Ulchalothe in Baldur's Gate: Dark Alliance II is the guardian of the Brazier of Eternal Flame.  There are illithid settlements of varying size in the games Neverwinter Nights: Hordes of the Underdark, Baldur's Gate II and Icewind Dale II.  The villain in the Neverwinter Nights premium module 'Kingmaker' is also an Illithid. The first act of Baldur's Gate III is focused on removing mind flayer larvae from the player characters' brains.

 In Planescape: Torment, the player character may uncover a history of the illithids as they relate to the githzerai and the githyanki through studying the rings of the Unbroken Circle of Zerthimon in Dak'kon's possession.

 In episode 30 of the webcomic "Order of the Stick" (written by Rich Burlew), the party bard Elan encounters an illithid in its lair. The illithid opts not to consume Elan's brain due to the bard's stupidity, and so they start playing Scrabble instead. Episode 31 makes a reference to the illithid's preferred diet. Episode 32 makes a fourth-wall reference to the fact that the illithid isn't open source material.

 In the Final Fantasy series, players encounter an enemy called the Mindflayer, a cave-dwelling magic user that has the head of a squid, wears a flowing robe, and wields a staff. When the first game for the NES was brought to North America it was referred to as a Sorcerer. Although the Mindflayer's name and appearance have been kept the same, the "Beholder" was changed to Evil Eye.

 The Netflix series Stranger Things, following the eighth episode of the second season, used the name "Mind Flayer" to refer to one of the main antagonists of the series due to their similar natures.

Licensing 
The illithid is considered "Product Identity" by Wizards of the Coast and as such is not released under its Open Game License.

References

Further reading
Cagle, Eric, et al. Fiend Folio (Wizards of the Coast, 2003).
Pramas, Chris. "Exiles from the Vault." Dragon #298. Renton, WA: Wizards of the Coast, 2002.
Pramas, Chris. "Underground Scenarios." Dragon #294. Renton, WA: Wizards of the Coast, 2002.
Schwartz, Christopher M. "The New Illithid Arsenal." Dragon #255 (TSR, 1999).
Williams, Penny. "Armed To the Tentacle." Dragon #308 (Paizo Publishing, 2003).
Wyatt, James. "Knights of the Lich-Queen." Dungeon #100. Bellevue, WA: Paizo Publishing, 2003.
Cordell, Bruce R. Expanded Psionics Handbook (Wizards of the Coast, 2004).

External links
Illithids at Planescape website

How to Design the PERFECT Mind Flayer Encounter at CBR.com

Dungeons & Dragons monsters
Fictional characters who have mental powers
Fictional parasites and parasitoids